Francisco da Silveira Pinto da Fonseca Teixeira, 1st Count of Amarante (1 September 1763 – 27 May 1821), was a Portuguese army officer who fought in the War of Oranges and other campaigns of the Peninsular War.

Biography
Francisco da Silveira was born in the town of Canelas (now Peso da Régua), the son of Manuel da Silveira Pinto da Fonseca and Antónia Silveira.

Career
He became a cadet in the Almeida Cavalry Regiment on 25 April 1780, from which his career developed in subsequent years: he was promoted to ensign by 27 February 1790; then lieutenant in the 6th Cavalry Regiment, then called the Light Regiment of Chaves, on 17 December 1792, before becoming a captain and adjunct-aide to the field marshal of the Province of Beira, João Brun da Silveira, on 17 December 1799. He succeeded his father as the Majorat of Espírito Santo on 22 February 1785.

During the war between France and Spain (in 1801), Francisco da Silveira, along with other important people in the province, raised a voluntary corp, and as sergeant figured in the Monterei company, commanded by Gomes Freire de Andrade. He was rewarded by being assigned to the 6th Cavalry Regiment, first as sergeant, then as lieutenant commander on 14 March 1803.

Peninsular wars
He commanded the cavalry in 1807, when the Portuguese army was ordered to march from the borders to the coast. He was in Aveiro, when in December he was called to Coimbra to testify for the annihilation of the 6th, 9th, 11th and 12th regiments, by General Junot. With the fall of the monarchy in sight, he escaped to Porto in order to board an English ship, where he assumed that he would depart for Brazil. His plan foiled, he escaped to Vila Real, where he later became one of the factors in the acclamation of the legitimate government in 1808.

In March 1809 he led a force which carried out the successful Siege of Chaves from its French garrison. He kept the French from capturing Amarante from 18 April to 3 May 1809 during the second French invasion of Portugal. Driven out, he later recaptured the place and helped cut off the forces of Nicolas Soult, forcing the French marshal to abandon his artillery and wagon trains in order to escape. He commanded a Portuguese division in Arthur Wellesley, Marquess of Wellington's Allied army at the Battle of Vitoria on 21 June 1813.

References
 
 
 
 

1763 births
1821 deaths
People from Peso da Régua
Portuguese soldiers
Portuguese generals
Counts of Amarante
Portuguese military commanders of the Napoleonic Wars
People of the Peninsular War
18th-century Portuguese people
19th-century Portuguese people

Portuguese nobility